Platypsyllinae is a subfamily of the family Leiodidae, known as mammal-nest beetles. The group was formerly known as the family Leptinidae but the name Platypsyllidae had seniority, and is now ranked as a subfamily.

Genera
Leptinillus Horn, 1882
Leptinus Müller, 1817
Platypsyllus Ritsema, 1869
Silphopsyllus Olsufiev, 1923

References 

Leiodidae